Dharhara is a community development block (an administrative division) in Munger District of Bihar, India.

History 
Kali temple was built in the year 1326.

Company & Factories 
RBS ENGINEERING COMPANY
News War (National Hindi News paper) website: www.newswarindia.com

Divisions 
Panchayats under the Dharhara block include:
 Ajimganj
 Amari
 Aurabagicha
 Bahachouki (or Barichak)
 Bangalwa
 Dharhara Maharna
 Dharhara South
 Etawa
 Hemjapur
 Mahagama
 Matadih
 Sarobag
 Shivkund

Religion
The population of the block (village) is a mix of peoples from community consisting of Hindus, Muslims & Christians among other denominations, all living in peaceful co-existence.

Transport 
 Rail - Dharhara railway station is situated on Sahibganj Loop line. Dharhara is well connected by rail in Eastern Railway Zone (India) via Kiul junction in west & Jamalpur in east.
 Road - Munger (via Jamalpur, Bihar) is around one hours travel from Dharhara by road.
 Air - The nearest airport is at Patna, around four hours from Dharhara by rail.

Education/Sports 
 Major educational institute is the 50 years old high school (Kumar Ramanand Smarak High School).
 RBS Youth Club. (Royal Bihar Sports Youth Club).
 Shri Shankar Sporting Club .

References 

Community development blocks in Munger district